Goodhue may refer to:

Places

United States
Goodhue County, Minnesota
Goodhue, Minnesota
Goodhue Township, Goodhue County, Minnesota

People
Benjamin Goodhue (1748–1814), U.S. representative and senator from Massachusetts
Bertram Goodhue (1869–1924), American architect
Dale L. Goodhue (born c. 1944), American organizational theorist and computer scientist
Frederick Goodhue (1867–1940), Scottish rugby footballer
Harry Wright Goodhue (1905–1931) was a stained glass artist 
Lyle Goodhue (1903–1981), American inventor and scientist
Mary B. Goodhue (1921–2004), American politician and lawyer
Ralph B. Goodhue (1878-1960), American farmer and politician
Goodhue Livingston (1867–1951), member of Trowbridge & Livingston, architectural firm in New York City